The individual dressage at the 2021 European Dressage Championships in Hagen, germany was held at Hof Kasselmann from 7 to 12 September.

Germany's Jessica von Bredow-Werndl won the gold medal in both Grand Prix Special and Grand Prix Freestyle, repeating her success after the Olympic Games. Title defender Isabell Werth representing Germany won a silver medal in the Grand Prix Special. Cathrine Dufour of Denmark won a bronze in special.

Competition format

The team and individual dressage competitions used the same results. Dressage had three phases. The first phase was the Grand Prix. Top 30 individuals advanced to the second phase, the Grand Prix Special where the first individual medals were awarded. The last set of medals at the 2021 European Dressage Championships was awarded after the third phase, the Grand Prix Freestyle where top 15 combinations competed.

Schedule

All times are Central European Summer Time (UTC+2)

Results

Team ranking

References

2021 in equestrian